This is a list of characters for the manga Ushio & Tora written and illustrated by Kazuhiro Fujita.

Main characters

The son of a temple priest and a lady shaman, destined to wield the Beast Spear and defeat the super yōkai Hakumen no Mono. He is very kind-hearted and greatly values all life and friendships. With his ideals, he manages to unite the forces of mankind and yōkai against Hakumen through his example of his fighting partnership with Tora. Ushio loves Asako and cares a lot for Mayuko, and will promptly appear to save them from yōkai attacks.
Ushio is revealed to be quite clever since after he learns about the Beast Spear history, he knows that his life will be ended prematurely due to the nature of the Beast Spear power that consumes his own soul to empower a human body against Youkai. His kind heart makes him go against the notion of others wielding his cursed weapon. He lost his reason once the Beast Spear hijacked his body, transforming him into a beast and making him run to Kamuikotan, a place where his time travelling journey reveals why he is the chosen one to be the Beast Spear wielder. After the battle, he is almost turned into an Azafuse before the spirits of Jie Mei and her brother appear from the Beast Spear and tell him to live their part of lives for them as a human.

An ancient tiger-like yōkai similar to a Raijū who was released when Ushio pulled off the Beast Spear. Prior to being pinned in the basement of Ushio's temple, he was known as Nagatobimaru, famously feared among the yōkai community for his sheer strength and powers of lightning. Being trapped in the basement for 500 years, he has great curiosity over modern lifestyle and gadgets. His favorite food is hamburgers, which Mayuko always provides when they meet. He states that he has every intention to eat Ushio and Mayuko, thus will not let them be taken away by other yōkai. However, Tora seems to enjoy their company, and he has said that he will not do something as low as attempting to eat Ushio in his sleep, implying he would prefer fair combat. He also explains the reason why he protects Ushio despite saying he'll eat him is that he never feels bored around him. Tora cares deeply about Ushio, which he always tries to deny. It is later revealed that monsters like Tora are former humans who previously wielded the beast spear but lost their humanity over time.
Despite being similar to other Azafuse, Tora is a bit special, because his former human body is used by Hakumen no Mono as host since he was a baby. Due to this fact, Tora's body has a similar scent as Hakumen, making it unable to detect the Beast Spear inside his body, which explains why, for 500 years, Hakumen's minions didn't find and raze down the temple Ushio and his father lived in while Tora was pinned down to a wall and sealed right beneath it.

Supporting characters

The hot-headed, tomboyish childhood friend of Ushio and Mayuko. She and Ushio love each other the most, and she also cares for Mayuko a lot. Her family owns a ramen restaurant.

Ushio and Asako's best friend. She is more sweet and feminine. She cares for Ushio and has feelings for him but understands he and Asako love each other and helps the two be together. She also has feelings for Tora, whom she readily buys hamburgers for. Later, she took in Kirio as her stepbrother. It is also revealed that she belongs to the lineage of powerful lady shamans. Therefore, Mayuko is able to create psychic barriers powerful enough to hold back Hakumen.

Ushio's father, keeper of the temple he and his son live in. He's a stern, businesslike man at times, but also kind and wise. His secret identity is being one of strongest priest of a special Buddhist sect named Kouhamei, dedicated to fighting yōkai.

An orphaned girl who goes to the same school as Ushio, Asako and Mayuko. Her father was very overprotective of her, and when he died he became an oni, causing danger to any boys who took the slightest fancy of her. This distressed her greatly, and she tried to commit suicide many times in vain. Ushio finally made her father realize his errors, and he left for the afterworld. Thereafter, Reiko was able to lead a normal life, and became good friends with Ushio, Asako and Mayuko.

A powerful Chinese exorcist, highly skilled in geomancy, usage of seals and flying spears. He travels around China and eventually comes to Japan to seek the yōkai who killed his wife and his daughter, and took out his right eye and left three long scars on his face. In his right eye socket now is a magical blue crystal ball used to save his life by his teacher. Hyō initially thinks Tora is the one who murdered his family, but Ushio convinces him Tora is innocent, and Hyō later calms down a little, becoming a valued ally. He died after finally killing Guren, the murderer of his family, while defending a mother and her child.

The spirit guardian who lives in the darkness of the Beast Spear. She is the sister of Giryō, who sacrificed her life to create the blade of the spear. She reincarnated as Yuki, the first of the lineage of powerful lady shamans, all but one has the same look as her. Jie Mei is able freely materialize anywhere needed, and first appeared to help prevent Ushio from transforming into a Beast by having his soul totally absorbed by the spear.

The brother of Jie Mei, a highly skilled blacksmith who eventually goes insane from being unable to prevent her sacrifice. Filled with anger, remorse and regret, he hammered his body into the shaft of the spear. His spirit is trapped in the darkness of the spear, unlike his sister, and can greatly influence the user of the spear with his fury. Still, he has pledged his loyalty to Ushio. He served as the Beast Spear's shaft.

A young girl whose father was killed in an airplane crash caused by Fusuma, a flying demon. Initially she blamed her father's long-time friend Atsuzawa for the incident, but after helping Ushio to defeat Fusuma, she learns the truth and forgives Atsuzawa.  Her father is revived and aided in the final battle against Hakumen no Mono.

A young girl descended from a long line of white-haired women who have maintained the success of the Takatori household by appeasing the childlike spirit Omamori. She is shy and easily intimidated, apologizing profusely even when the other is at fault. At first she is reluctant to let Ushio destroy the barrier imprisoning Omamori, as the backlash of energy would destroy her, but she relents when Tora decides to deflect the backlash. In the aftermath, she tells Ushio of her decision to become stronger like him, and slowly becomes more outgoing and healthier. Oddly, her hair starts turning brown as well, perhaps symbolizing the end of her "job". Like her mother  and those before her, Saya has the ability to open the Gates of Hell once in her lifetime.  She opens the Gates of Hell to revive fallen allies in their final fight against Hakumen no Mono.  Once the battle is over, Omamori decides to close the Gates of Hell in her place, with her mother watching on the opposite side of the gate.

A former yakuza who left the business when he was diagnosed with cancer, and unconsciously decided to return to his home village. He was a delinquent as a child and was picked on and looked down by the others in his village, leading to his distaste for others. He sacrifices himself to seal Shimuna, the mist spirit and keep it from destroying his village. In the chapters afterward, Ushio wears Shinji's overcoat in memory of his sacrifice.

Reiko's classmate and childhood friend. They became estranged after the death of Reiko's father, but made up with her after he and Ushio defeat the Oni that once was Reiko's father.

A pilot and friend of Yū Hiyama's father. He saw the Fusuma kill his friend and when Ushio and Tora killed the sky demon, Yū apologized to him for blaming him for her father's death.

Ushio's Mother who was presumed dead, until a Youkai told Ushio that she's alive and hated by all Youkai. She's the third in a line of lady shamans that has kept Hakumen no Mono imprisoned for 800 years in the depths of the ocean to prevent it from destroying Japan. Jie Mei allowed her to leave her post for two years, which allowed her to meet Shigure and had Ushio before being forced to return to the seal.

The Kōhamei Sect

A petite old woman who commands the respect of the entire sect, being the Second Oyakume who maintains Hakumen no Mono's barrier prison. She was the shaman who sealed the Gamin in the boxes a long time ago. She has sacrificed herself by using all her psychic powers to kill one of the avatars of Hakumen no Mono that attacked the Kōhamei Sect headquarters.  She is revived and participates in the final battle against Hakumen no Mono.

The leader of the Kōhamei sect, and the younger brother of Kyōra, nearly identical to him except for a large scar across the right side of his face. Initially Nigira is against entrusting Ushio with the Beast Spear, but is finally convinced by Oyakume to observe Ushio in order to test his worth.
 The older brother of Nigira, who was excommunicated from the sect for ignoring the teachings of Buddha in order to pursue his singular desire to exterminate yōkai, but the sect is not above calling on him to do their dirty work for them. He attacks Ushio and Tora in Aomori castle, but is defeated when Ushio becomes one with the Beast Spear. He feels humiliated for being unable to defeat Ushio and Tora and vows to defeat them by all means, including stealing a special weapon from the Kouhamei Temple to do so. Despite his hostile attitude to other Kouhamei sect members, Kyora is very fond of Mikado Hizaki, demonstrated when he willingly stab his own thigh to break the seal on his leg or cut off his own leg, in a futile attempt to save the latter from Towako. The battle aftermath saw him sitting atop of piles of Black Horde of Azafuse, while grudgingly moan that others keep dumping their responsibilities to him.

A tough, caustic, skilled, no-nonsense girl who is extremely against Ushio being one of the four Chosen of the Beast Spear because she believes him to be undisciplined and reckless, far below those who trained all their lives in the Kouhamei sect in order to be selected to use the Beast Spear. When she gets the chance to wield the Spear, it rejects her, returning instead to Ushio. Hinowa is still reluctant to acknowledge Ushio as the true bearer of the Spear, but she ends up helping him from time to time anyway. Hinowa channels her power through a pair of combs and is able to cast barriers. She's among the females that combing Ushio's hair that grow long during his rampage under Beast Spear's influence at Kamuikotan, and after gruelling battle manages to help return Ushio to normal.

One of the four Chosen of the Beast Spear who is very well versed at using the shakuja and other holy weapons to deal with monsters. While initially appearing laid back and composed, he is later revealed to have a dark drive to satisfy the boredom in his life due to a lack of any challenges until Tora came along. This leads him to side with Hakumen no Mono and sabotages Ushio's plans. Before their combat, Ushio ask Tora to spare Nagare's life if he defeats him. Despite Nagare's best effort, Tora beat him and he dies happily, while Tora watching with a frown, revealed his reason to hate humans is that they are too fragile, compared to himself. Nagare's death is what makes Tora and Ushio friendship broke, which Tora noted, leave a feeling as if there's a hole in his chest. Nagare returns as one of the Spirits that aid Ushio in his final combat against Hakumen no Mono.

A master shikigami user and the most senior of the four Chosen of the Beast Spear. He was possessed by Hiyou to attack Ushio and destroy the Beast Spear. He is very protective of his younger sister Jun.

Satoru's younger sister. While she failed to become a Chosen of the Beast Spear, she's capable of pouring a large quantity of spiritual energy in special occasions.

The youngest but also the strongest of the four Chosen of the Beast Spear. He wields the Elzaar Scythe and is accompanied by an artificial monster partner call Kuin. It turns out that he is created by Inasa and Towako from a human child to wield the Elzaar Scythe, a weapon intended to be a substitute to the Beast Spear. He is used to infiltrating Kouhamei Sect headquarter which resulting in him defeated by Ushio and witnessing Towako rampage which killed Hizaki Mikado, make him realize his wrong way. After his time travelling journey, Kirio is the one that told Mayuko about Tora's past as the first Beast Spear wielder as well as Hakumen no Mono's human host before born. Later he is taken in and lives with the Inoue family, adopted as her younger brother.

H.A.M.M.R. (Head Anti Metamorphose Measure Research)

One of the researcher that sent a letter to Ushio. The letter contains vital information about Ushio and the Beast Spear interaction effects on his body. It is revealed that the Beast Spear actually a double-edged weapon that harms Youkai and the user. Because the human soul is finite, the more Ushio uses the Beast Spear, the closer his 'death' as human beings come. The letter also revealed that Ushio's soul vessel almost empty and his next battle against Hakumen is a one way trip to his own demise. This letter accidentally discovered and read by Asako when she visits a temple's ruin. Asako so horrified enough that she calls H.A.M.M.R. headquarters number in the letter, and despite losing her memory of Ushio due to Hiyo, urge all her friends to board H.A.M.M.R. helicopter to chase him. Unsuccessfully bring him home after Ushio said that he already noticed a long time ago that his journey is not homeward.

Helena was the lead scientist of HAMMER, well respected by her colleagues. When they kidnap Ushio, Asako, and Tora, in order to study the full capabilities of Ushio, Tora, and the Beast Spear, a piece of Hakumen no Mono comes alive and devours many Yokai HAMMER has in captivity for study. Helena is gravely wounded during the battle but she stays to monitor it in order to gather as much data as possible for her colleagues. Asako assists her until Helena convinces her to leave before the facility self-destructs. Asako also learns from Helena that she had a son named Paul who died despite scientific advancements, and in her final moments, Helena thinks of her son and dies with a smile on her face (having succeeded in compiling and sending sufficient data to her colleagues).

Supernatural beings

Hostile

A 200-year-old centipede demon that turns its victims into stone before devouring them; it does this slowly in order to relish the fear of its victims. Inhabited a stone statue of a samurai until it was defeated by Ushio. Its broken pieces were later collected and made into a supernatural armour for Ushio.

Formerly the master artist Michio Hanyuu. When his wife ran off with one of his students he became filled with hate and became an oni after he died.  His soul inhabited a painting he had made of his daughter Reiko and was fiercely jealous of anyone who tried to get close to her, resulting in 'accidents' happening to all those who did.  He finally passed on after Ushio defeated him by stabbing the painting he inhabited with the Beast Spear.  He is revived and fights during the final conflict with Hakumen no Mono.

A group of five demonic heads that were sealed in boxes that were pinned beneath a massive stone by the priestess Mikado Hizaki. After they were unwittingly released by a construction team they slaughtered the workers and searched the city for Hizaki in order to exact their revenge even though Hizaki was long dead. They pursued Mayuko because her appearance was identical to Hizaki's, but they were confronted and defeated by Tora (because he wanted to eat Mayuko himself at the time).

An avatar of Hakumen no mono who takes on the form of a giant long purple whale like sea serpent.

A sky-going demon that eats humans, he caused an air carrier to crash and devoured all 200 occupants including Yū's father. He attacked the plane that Ushio, Tora, Yū and Atsuzawa were on and killed the pilots in order to control the plane.  However he was wounded in the neck by the Beast Spear and was completely destroyed by an exploding missile from an air support fighter plane (according to Tora his weaknesses are the tooth of an ohaguro and large amounts of fire). Before dying he remarks that it was not a bad thing to die before Hakumen no Mono's awakening.

An invincible demon composed of only corrosive mist that dissolves and digests humans, yōkai and any organic matter.He is also one of Hakumen no mono's avatars'.

A black Azafuse with a sadistic heart who has pledged to assist Hakumen no Mono in exchange for being released from his stone hibernation and given three obake-killing blades. Once a human mercenary who loved killing more than anything, one day he found the Beast Spear and used it to slay Youkai until he turned into an Azafuse, murdering and devouring families whenever he pleased. Hyou's family was murdered by him and after a very long fight, he was slain by Hyou, avenging his family at the cost of his own life.

Allied

An old acquaintance of Tora back when he was called Nagatobimaru. A guardian of the ocean he takes the form of an elderly man with a walking stick and a sake jug. He enlists the help of Ushio and Tora in order to subdue a giant sea serpent. Later he inadvertently reveals to Ushio that his mother (whom he thought dead) is still alive and hated by all yōkai.
The Kamaitachi Siblings

 

 

A trio of kamaitachi living in the area around Tono that consists of the eldest brother Raishin, the middle brother Juurou and the younger sister Kagari. They were driven from their old home when it was turned into a golf course and Juurou, originally a gentle demon became filled with hatred for humans and began wantonly killing any he found. When they heard that Ushio was in the area, Raishin and Kagari approached Ushio to ask for his help. During the battle Ushio after realizing where Juurou was coming from began to cry for the sufferings of yōkai which moved Juurou, who along with Tora and the workers of a construction site managed to free Raishin and Kagari when they were pinned under a construction vehicle. Afterwards Ushio promised to find a place for the siblings to live, but Juurou, believing that such a place did not exist, attacked Ushio causing him to kill Juurou on reflex and he died, finally at peace. Afterwards Raishin and Kagari became staunch allies of Ushio and Tora, defending them against the wrathful demons of Tono.  Juurou is revived during the final battle with Hakumen no Mono fighting alongside his siblings one last time.

A zashiki warashi spirit imprisoned by the Takatori family in order to ensure the family's prosperity. During her imprisonment Omamori has been comforted by a long line of white-haired women including Saya's mother. She foretold the coming of a boy with a spear who would free her from her imprisonment, this was fulfilled when Ushio came to the Takatori house and destroyed the barrier imprisoning her. Even after the destruction of the Takatori household she remains behind to watch over Saya. She sides with Ushio during the attack of the Tono and spoke to Osa on his behalf.

An old Mirror yōkai that's acquainted with the Kamaitachi. He's asked by Ushio to help him save Asako and Mayuko from a Fiendish Mirror, which he reluctantly agreed.  It's revealed he serves as the story's narrator.

A friendly Kappa that heals Ushio when he was injured by the Tono yōkai. He also tells him the song about Hakumen no Mono and why all yōkai fear and hate it.

A youkai who once fought alongside Tora, and various other youkai, to take out Hakumen. He at first refuses to stop targeting Ushio, but after being defeated by Tora, he's forced to comply.

The wise chief of the Tono yōkai whose true self is that of a powerful Tengu. He is revealed to be also the chief of the Kanto yōkai.

A small fox-like spirit sent by the Osa of Tono to assist Ushio in his effort to purge the demons possessing Moritsuna.
 

The time travelling yōkai who send Ushio and Tora back to the past to observe the birth of the Beast Spear.

 An artificial youkai created by Inasa to aid Kirio against Hakumen no Mono. Unless he gets pissed off, he's always very calm and collected in any situation, having a rivalry with Tora.

The chief of the Kansai yōkai, who believed that his army could defeat the imprisoned Hakumen no Mono. He wields a huge claymore like a katana called Rubashiri.

A blue Muscular humanoid yokai who takes the form of a human boy and one of the Monsters from H.A.M.M.R until Asako saved him after The lab exploded, he later returned with other baldeners' fighting off the Black horde saving Asako.

Large orange, tiger like yōkai, like Tora, who were once humans. Before they turned into yōkai, they all had wielded the Beast Spear hundreds and thousands of years before Ushio. They were unheard of because they turned themselves into stone to wait for the awakening of Hakumen No Mono. They were destroyed by the Black Horde while in their stone forms, but were determined to fight in the battle against Hakumen and turned themselves into armor for Tora to aid him.

A mind-reading youkai once lived deep in the mountain region which became a plane crash site. He takes a liking to a boy named Minoru for his pure and kind heart and protects him till the rescue team arrives and takes him away. However, Satori obsession with the boy leads him to murder a lot of humans to harvest their eyes, which in turn summon Ushio's father to fight and capture or kill him. Turn out Satori just want to cure Minoru and make him be able to see again, and accidentally overheard a nurse talking about eye transplantation surgery, hence he began his murder spree. Every night he visits Minoru in the hospital to try to put his victim's eyes in Minoru eyesockets leading the nurses to find a lot of blood not of the boy every morning on the sheet. In one of his visits, he encounters Ushio who beast spear didn't react due to lack of hostile intent from the Yokai. After Ushio finally realizes Satori identity and his murders, he confronts the yokai outside the hospital and after a short combat, managed to beat the youkai who finally calm down and think about Minoru's feeling over his murder. The calm is broken when a nurse walk-in and witness the  Yokai whose instinct is to attack the innocent, prompting the Beast spear to automatically attack and kill him instantly while Ushio watching in horror. Satori's death is one of the most devastating ones for Ushio, since he must lie to Minoru about his "Father" disability to show up after his successful eye transplant, which he confess to Asako, the first-ever lie he uttered. Satori is among the spirit that aids Ushio during his final combat with Hakumen no Mono along with Juuro, Nagare, Hyou, and Shinji Tokuno.

Hakumen no Mono

An extremely powerful, golden nine-tailed fox born from ancient times who enjoys destroying countries by manipulating the rulers and creating fear among humans and yōkai. Currently, he is trapped in an immense psychic barrier maintained by a lineage of lady shamans under the sea south of Japan. However, this does not keep him completely helpless and plots to destroy the Beast Spear before he finally escapes from its imprisonment.
Each of the nine tails has specific abilities and can spawn various minion yōkai and avatars, that can phase through the barrier to do his bidding. The avatars of Hakumen no Mono are some of the strongest monsters ever faced by the protagonists.

Small yōkai minions spawned from Hakumen that looks like a flying eyeball with ears. They can combine together to form a stronger entity or attack en masse in huge numbers. They are also capable of eating specific memories in humans and bakemono alike.

A giant cricket-like monster that easily broke through the protective barrier of the Kouhamei Sect Main Headquarters. Possesses razor sharp claws and body that can reflect standard attacks.

An avatar in the form of an enigmatic lady who suddenly appeared to assist the renegade Kouhamei monk, Inasa, in his research to create the Elzaar Scythe. After Inasa died, Towako acted as Kirio's mom and through the boy, manipulated a group of Kouohamei Sect monks to abduct the Beast Spear. She did manage to partially destroy the Beast Spear but it was revived by Ushio's pledge.

Powerful clones created using Guren as the base. Therefore, resembling black Azafuses.

References

Ushio and Tora